An Esperanto club is a club of Esperanto speakers, or Esperantists. In contrast to national or international Esperanto organizations, an Esperanto club usually limits its activities only to a certain city or region. Esperanto clubs have been forming the backbone of the Esperanto movement since the beginning of the movement, although recently the situation is starting to change due to the possibility of immediate and first-hand communication that is provided by the Internet.

The first Esperanto club was founded in Nuremberg on 18 February 1885, before Esperanto was published (1887) – originally it was a group of supporters of Volapük, who in 1888 unanimously converted to Esperanto, under the influence of Leopold Einstein. The Nuremberg club was also the first to start publishing an Esperanto magazine, La Esperantisto.

Characteristics 
Esperanto clubs may differ in a variety of ways:
 Existence of a permanent meeting place;
 Regularity and variety of activities;
 Solid member base (and collection of membership fees);
 Specialization in a certain level of Esperanto knowledge;
 Specific interest in a topic behind Esperanto itself (e.g. Esperanto teachers club, students club, club of Esperanto-speaking paramedics, club linked to a science center etc.);
 Relation to a national Esperanto organization (usually the local branch of the Universal Esperanto Association);
 Regular organization of Esperanto language courses.

List of first Esperanto clubs 
Following is a list of Esperanto clubs founded between 1887 and 1895, i.e. during the first nine years of Esperanto's existence (names of the founders are given in brackets):

 1888
 Nuremberg (Christian Schmidt)
 1889
 Moscow
 Sofia (Bogdanov)
 1890
 Schalke (Trompeter)
 Ivanovo-Voznesensk (Antoni Grabowski)
 1891
 Munich - "Societo E-isto-ja" = Internacia Klubo de Korespondado (L. E. Meyer of Nuremberg)
 Uppsala (S. Lundström)
 Murom (W. Brzozowski)
 Freiburg im Breisgau (dr. Haas)
 Saint Petersburg (Art. Florell)
 1892
 Málaga
 Gothenburg (G. Backman)
 Osterby (Ossian Holmquist)
 Erlangen (Fr. v. Brtesen)
 Schweinfurt (P. Kramer, Kirschner, Brand)
 Vilnius (A. Naumann)
 1893
 Warsaw (Al. Blumental, Rubin, J. Wasniewski)
 1894
 Steneby (Lindgven)
 Odessa (Gernet, Borovko)
 Reims-Soissons (Huisson)
 Helsinki (W. Fagershom)
 1895
 Vladimir (V. Solodiĥin)

However, at the end of 1904, only three of these clubs were still in existence: Uppsala, Saint Petersburg, and Odessa. Other clubs often did not survive more than a year, as it was the case of the group in Reims, which was formed by young students of the local lyceum.

See also 
 Esperanto movement

References

External links 
 EsperantoLand: Esperanto clubs in the world 

 
Club